The Tuolba is a river of Sakha Republic, eastern Russia. Its source is in the Aldan Highlands and it is a right tributary of the Lena, The Tuolba runs through the village of Alexeyevka.

See also
List of rivers of Russia

References

Rivers of the Sakha Republic
Aldan Highlands